Danny Sullivan's Indy Heat is a 1991 racing game developed and published in arcades by Leland Corporation. It stars American IndyCar driver Danny Sullivan, and features the tracks of the CART series of the early 1990s. Home versions of the game were released for the Nintendo Entertainment System, Amiga, Atari ST, and Commodore 64.

Gameplay

Indy Heat featured four-player capability, and was similar in gameplay to Super Off Road. Players earned money based on their race finishing positions, which was spent on improving their car. The race season culminated with the Tradewest Speed Bowl, which loosely resembled the Indianapolis 500.

Tracks
There are 14 tracks in the arcade version, all of which are based on actual IndyCar racetracks. The NES port includes 9 of those tracks though all have been renamed. Pocono, which is based on Pocono Raceway, has been inexplicably moved to Illinois. Indianapolis has been renamed Tradewest after the publisher of the NES version. The NES Michigan track is not the same as the arcade-exclusive track of the same name. 
 Phoenix (arcade exclusive): 8 Laps
 Vancouver (West Canada on NES): 5 Laps
 Indianapolis (Tradewest on NES): 8 Laps, 12 Laps on NES and final arcade race
 Long Beach (S. California on NES): 5 Laps
 Detroit (Michigan on NES): 5 Laps
 Pocono (Illinois on NES): 8 Laps
 Cleveland (Ohio on NES): 5 Laps
 East Rutherford/Meadowlands (New Jersey on NES): 5 Laps
 Toronto (East Canada on NES): 5 Laps
 Michigan (arcade exclusive): 8 Laps
 Lexington/Mid Ohio (arcade exclusive): 5 Laps
 Elkhart Lake (arcade exclusive): 5 Laps
 Cook's/Monterey (arcade exclusive): 5 Laps
 Denver (Colorado on NES): 5 Laps

Ports

The arcade game was later ported by Rare and published by Tradewest for the Nintendo Entertainment System in 1992. Indy Heat was the third NES game to be released that featured an American indy car driver, the others being Al Unser Jr.'s Turbo Racing and Michael Andretti's World GP. As well as the NES, the game was also ported by The Sales Curve (now Square Enix Europe) for the Commodore Amiga, Atari ST and the Commodore 64 the same year. Due to Danny Sullivan's promotion expiring, the racing game was released for the latter simply as "Indy Heat". A Sega Genesis version was developed but never officially published, though a number of reproduction copies were released.

Reception
British gaming magazine The One reviewed the arcade version of Indy Heat in 1991, calling the game's tracks "very prettily constructed" and praising its gameplay, noting how the player may choose to drive carefully to have minimal pit stops, although going slower, or drive "like a maniac" to go faster, but risking breaking down. The One furthermore praises the player's ability to buy upgrades with the prize money from races in-game. The One expressed that "it's this level of dynamic strategy within and between the races that makes this my game of the month".

See also
Super Sprint
Super Off Road

References

External links
Danny Sullivan's Indy Heat at arcade-history

Interview with the Amiga programmer John Croudy

Nintendo Entertainment System games
IndyCar Series video games
1991 video games
Amiga games
Arcade video games
Atari ST games
Cancelled Sega Genesis games
Commodore 64 games
Multiplayer and single-player video games
Video games scored by David Wise
Video games scored by Sam Powell
Video games developed in the United States
Video games based on real people